In physics and in particular in the theory of magnetism, an antidynamo theorem is one of several results that restrict the  type of magnetic fields that may be produced by dynamo action.  

One notable example is Thomas Cowling's antidynamo theorem which states that no axisymmetric magnetic field can be maintained through a self-sustaining dynamo action by an axially symmetric current. Similarly, the Zeldovich's antidynamo theorem states that a two-dimensional, planar flow cannot maintain the dynamo action.

Consequences
Apart from the Earth's magnetic field, some other bodies such as Jupiter and Saturn, and the Sun have significant magnetic fields whose major component is a dipole, an axisymmetric magnetic field. These magnetic fields are self-sustained through fluid motion in the Sun or planets, with the necessary non-symmetry for the planets deriving from the Coriolis force caused by their rapid rotation, and one cause of non-symmetry for the Sun being its differential rotation.

The magnetic fields of planets with slow rotation periods and/or solid cores, such as Mercury, Venus, and Mars, have dissipated to almost nothing by comparison.

The impact of the known anti-dynamo theorems is that successful dynamos do not possess a high degree of symmetry.

See also 
 Dynamo theory
 Magnetosphere of Jupiter
 Magnetosphere of Saturn

References

Geomagnetism
Magnetohydrodynamics
Physics theorems
No-go theorems